Amos Richard Scott (February 5, 1883 – January 18, 1911) was an American baseball pitcher who played for the Cincinnati Reds in 1901.

Biography
Scott was born on February 5, 1883, in Bethel, Ohio. He was signed by the Cincinnati Reds after he wrote about his amateur performance to Cincinnati newspapers. He started two games for the 1901 Reds, losing 6–2 and 9–3, both times against the New York Giants and Hall of Fame pitcher Christy Mathewson. He had an earned run average of 5.14 with 7 strikeouts.

He stood at six feet tall and weighed 180 pounds.

Dick Scott committed suicide by slitting his wrists with a pocket knife in Chicago on January 18, 1911.

References

External links 

Dick Scott at Baseball Almanac

1883 births
1911 suicides
Major League Baseball pitchers
Cincinnati Reds players
Baseball players from Ohio
People from Bethel, Ohio
Suicides by sharp instrument in the United States
Suicides in Illinois
Terre Haute Hottentots players